Stelian Bordeianu (born 15 September 1968) is a retired Romanian football goalkeeper.

References

1968 births
Living people
Romanian footballers
Liga I players
FC Politehnica Iași (1945) players
FC Dinamo București players
FC Brașov (1936) players
ASC Oțelul Galați players
Association football goalkeepers